Fisheries science is the academic discipline of managing and understanding fisheries. It is a multidisciplinary science, which draws on the disciplines of limnology, oceanography, freshwater biology, marine biology, meteorology, conservation, ecology, population dynamics, economics, statistics, decision analysis, management,  and many others in an attempt to provide an integrated picture of fisheries. In some cases new disciplines have emerged, as in the case of bioeconomics and fisheries law. Because fisheries science is such an all-encompassing field, fisheries scientists often use methods from a broad array of academic disciplines. Over the most recent several decades, there have been declines in fish stocks (populations) in many regions along with increasing concern about the impact of intensive fishing on marine and freshwater biodiversity.

Fisheries science is typically taught in a university setting, and can be the focus of an undergraduate, master's or Ph.D. program. Some universities offer fully integrated programs in fisheries science.  Graduates of university fisheries programs typically find employment as scientists, fisheries managers of both recreational and commercial fisheries, researchers, aquaculturists, educators, environmental consultants and planners, conservation officers, and many others.



Fisheries research
Because fisheries take place in a diverse set of aquatic environments (i.e., high seas, coastal areas, large and small rivers, and lakes of all sizes), research requires different sampling equipment, tools, and techniques.  For example, studying trout populations inhabiting mountain lakes requires a very different set of sampling tools than, say, studying salmon in the high seas.  Ocean fisheries research vessels (FRVs) often require platforms which are capable of towing different types of fishing nets, collecting plankton or water samples from a range of depths, and carrying acoustic fish-finding equipment. Fisheries research vessels are often designed and built along the same lines as a large fishing vessel, but with space given over to laboratories and equipment storage, as opposed to storage of the catch.  In addition to a diverse set of sampling gear, fisheries scientists often use scientific techniques from many different professional disciplines.

Other important areas of fisheries research are population dynamics, economics, social studies  and genetics.

Notable contributors

Members of this list meet one or more of the following criteria: 1) Author of widely cited peer-reviewed articles on fisheries, 2) Author of major reference work in fisheries, 3) Founder of major fisheries journal, museum or other related organisation 4) Person most notable for other reasons who has also worked in fisheries science.

Journals
Some journals about fisheries are

 Journal of Fisheries
 Fishery Bulletin
 Fisheries Oceanography
 Journal of the Fisheries Research Board
 Canadian Journal of Fisheries and Aquatic Sciences
 Transactions of the American Fisheries Society
 Fisheries Management and Ecology
 Fish and Fisheries
 Journal of Fish Biology
 Journal of Northwest Atlantic Fishery Science
 Journal of Fisheries and Aquatic Sciences
 The Open Fish Science Journal
 African Journal of Tropical Hydrobiology and Fisheries
 ICES Journal of Marine Science
 Reviews in Fisheries Science
 Chinese Fisheries Journal Listings
 General Fisheries Journal Listings

Professional societies
 World Council of Fisheries Societies
 American Fisheries Society
 The International Council for the Exploration of the Sea (ICES)
 The Fisheries Society of the British Isles
 The Japanese Society of Fisheries Science
 The Australian Society for Fish Biology

See also

 The 
Categories:
 Fisheries and aquaculture research institutes

Notes

References

 Hart, Paul J B and Reynolds, John D (2002) Handbook of Fish Biology and Fisheries, Chapter 1, The human dimensions of fisheries science. Blackwell Publishing. 
 Megrey BA and Moksness E (eds) (2009) Computers in Fisheries Research second edition, Springer. . 
 Pauly, D and Palomares, M L D (eds) (2002) Production Systems in Fishery Management UBC Fisheries Centre Research Reports 10(8).
 Payne A, Cotter AJR, Cotter J and Potter T (2008) Advances in fisheries science: 50 years on from Beverton and Holt John Wiley and Sons. .

External links
 
 The Sea Ahead... learning from the past. A web site of the Peter Wall Institute for Advanced Studies promoting ecosystem-based fisheries science.
 What is fisheries science?